Lewis Evans may refer to:

 Lewis Evans (controversialist) (fl. 1574), Welsh controversialist
 Lewis Evans (surveyor) (c. 1700–1756), Welsh colonial surveyor and geographer
 Lewis Evans (mathematician) (1755–1827), Welsh mathematician
 Lewis Evans (collector) (1853–1930), British businessman and scientific instrument collector
 Lewis Pugh Evans (1881–1962), British Brigadier General and World War I Victoria Cross recipient
 Lewis Evans (bishop) (1904–1996), Anglican bishop of Barbados
 Lewis Evans (rugby player) (born 1987), Welsh rugby union player
 Louis E. Atkinson (1841–1910), American physician, attorney and Republican politician
 Stuart Lewis-Evans (1930 – 1958), British racing driver